The First cabinet of Ólafur Thors was formed 16 May 1942.

Cabinet

Inaugural cabinet

See also 

1942 establishments in Iceland
1942 disestablishments in Iceland
Olafur Thors, First cabinet of
Cabinets established in 1942
Cabinets disestablished in 1942
Independence Party (Iceland)